The 2002–03 season was Southampton F.C.'s 11th season in the Premier League, and their 25th consecutive season in the top division of English football.

Season summary
After several seasons of underachievement, Southampton recorded a final placing of 8th, their highest placing in the Premier League. The club also reached the FA Cup final to face an Arsenal side which had narrowly missed out on the Premiership trophy; although Southampton lost by a single goal, as Arsenal had already qualified for the Champions League Southampton qualified for the UEFA Cup the following season.

A slow start to the season saw Southampton languishing in the relegation zone after eight matches played, but a run of eight wins and only two losses from the next fifteen matches saw Southampton rocket up the league table, peaking in fifth place. Unfortunately, the charge for European qualification through the league soon fizzled out as Southampton only won four of their last fifteen matches, dragging them down to eighth place - nonetheless, this was Southampton's highest-ever finish in the Premier League. The low point of this run was a 6–1 loss against a below-strength Arsenal side preparing for the FA Cup final. This did not bode well for the Saints, as they had also managed to reach the final, but as it transpired in the final Arsenal barely edged past Southampton, winning 1–0. Despite the disappointment of not winning the FA Cup, Southampton were rewarded with their cup run with a place in the UEFA Cup, as Arsenal had already qualified for the Champions League.

Key to Southampton's high finish was good home form - Southampton only lost two home games all season, against Manchester United and Liverpool. The good season gave Southampton hope of a more sustained charge at European qualification the next season.

Premier League

FA Cup

League Cup

Squad statistics

Transfers

In

Out

Loan in

Loan out

References

General

 Note: User must manually select option 2002/2003 from dropdown menu and select 'Go'.
 Note: User must manually select option 2002/2003 from dropdown menu and select 'Go'.
 Note: User must manually select option 2002/2003 from dropdown menu and select 'Go'.
Specific

Southampton F.C. seasons
Southampton